was a railway station in Mori, Kayabe District, Hokkaidō Prefecture, Japan. The station closed on March 12, 2022.

Lines
Hokkaido Railway Company
Hakodate Main Line Station H60

Railway stations in Hokkaido Prefecture
Railway stations in Japan opened in 1946
Railway stations closed in 2022